ZAC may refer to:

Zeitschrift für Antikes Christentum, an academic journal covering early Christianity and Patristics
Zinc-activated ion channel, a human protein
ZAC Browser (Zone for Autistic Children), a web browser for children and teenagers with autism and autism spectrum disorders
 -- French wikilink to "Zone of concentrated rehabilitation"
IATA airport code for York Landing Airport, in Manitoba, Canada

See also
Zac, a given name